This is a list of Principals of King's College London. The office of the Principal (Principal and President from 2009) is established by the Charter of King's College London as "the chief academic and administrative officer of the College". To date there have been 20 Principals, with two further announced holders of the role.

References

King's College London
King's College London
London education-related lists